MHS Aviation Berhad (formerly Malaysian Helicopter Services) (doing business as MHS Aviation) is a non-scheduled airline company based in Malaysia. Its operations are mainly in the oil and gas industry, where their helicopters transport personnel to offshore rigs. Its main clients are Petronas, Shell, ExxonMobil and others. Other than Malaysia, they also operate overseas, such as Mauritania, Syria and Timor Leste. They are the largest company in the offshore oil and gas helicopter market in Malaysia, having a 70% market share. MHS Aviation is a subsidiary of Boustead Group.

Fleet

Present fleet
 Eurocopter EC225 (EC225LP)
 Eurocopter AS332 Super Puma (AS332L2) 
 Eurocopter AS355 Ecureuil (AS355F2)
 Sikorsky S-76

Former fleet
 Sikorsky S-61

References

External links
 

1983 establishments in Malaysia
Airlines of Malaysia
Companies listed on Bursa Malaysia